Mohamed Shihab is a Maldivian politician.  He was the Speaker of Majlis of the Maldives — the legislature of Maldives and a member of the Jumhoory Party. He is a former senior member of Maldivian Democratic Party. He became the Speaker of Majlis on 12 August 2008, succeeding former Speaker Ahmed Zahir, and he served as the speaker until 28 May 2009.

He was terminated from the post of Managing Director of Maldives Post Limited in March 2006 for signing an MDP press release on 23 February 2006, condemning the government.

He was the last Minister of Finance for President Mohamed Nasheed's government from January 2012 to February 2012.  In October 2019, he was appointed as Advisor to the President in President Ibrahim Mohamed Solih's government.

References

Speakers of the People's Majlis
Finance ministers of the Maldives
Living people
Jumhooree Party politicians
Maldivian Democratic Party politicians
Maldivian Muslims
Year of birth missing (living people)